Great Northern Railway or Great Northern Railroad may refer to:

Australia 
Great Northern Railway (Queensland) in Australia
Great Northern Rail Services in Victoria, Australia
Central Australia Railway was known as the great Northern Railway in the 1890s in South Australia
Main North railway line, New South Wales (Australia)

Canada 
Great Northern Railway of Canada

Ireland 
Great Northern Railway (Ireland)

New Zealand 
Kingston Branch (New Zealand) in Southland
Main North Line, New Zealand and Waiau Branch in Canterbury

United Kingdom 
Great Northern Railway (Great Britain)
Thameslink and Great Northern, a current operator of trains on this route

United States 
Great Northern Railway (U.S.), now part of the BNSF Railway system
International – Great Northern Railroad in Texas, U.S., now part of the Union Pacific Railroad
New Orleans, Jackson and Great Northern in Louisiana and Mississippi, U.S., now part of the Canadian National Railway (freight transport) and Amtrak (passenger service) systems
Wisconsin Great Northern Railroad, operating in Wisconsin, U.S., since 1997